Lyperogryllacris is a genus of Orthopterans, sometimes known as 'leaf-folding crickets' in the tribe Gryllacridini.  The recorded distribution is from Indochina, and western Malesia.

Species 
The Orthoptera Species File lists:
 Lyperogryllacris bodenklossi (Karny, 1926)
 Lyperogryllacris caudelli (Karny, 1929)
 Lyperogryllacris forcipata Ingrisch, 2018
 Lyperogryllacris khuntan Ingrisch, 2018
 Lyperogryllacris luctuosa (Brunner von Wattenwyl, 1888)- type species (as Gryllacris luctuosa Brunner von Wattenwyl, locality Lahat, Sumatra)
 Lyperogryllacris maculipes (Walker, 1869)
 Lyperogryllacris mjobergi (Karny, 1925)
 Lyperogryllacris moultoni (Griffini, 1911)
 Lyperogryllacris nieuwenhuisi (Karny, 1931)
 Lyperogryllacris ocellata Ingrisch, 2018
 Lyperogryllacris robinsoni (Karny, 1926)
 Lyperogryllacris unicolor (Karny, 1931)
 Lyperogryllacris variegata (Karny, 1931)

References

External Links

Ensifera genera
Gryllacrididae
Orthoptera of Indo-China
Orthoptera of Malesia